Choreutis periploca is a species of moth of the family Choreutidae. It is found in Queensland.

References

External links
Australian Insects

Choreutis
Moths of Australia
Moths described in 1913